The 2020–21 ACB season, also known as Liga Endesa for sponsorship reasons, was the 38th season of the top Spanish professional basketball league, since its establishment in 1983. It started on 19 September 2020 with the first round of the regular season and ended on 15 June 2021 with the finals. 

It was the following season after the 2019–20 season was disrupted in response to the COVID-19 pandemic. Consequently, there were not relegations to LEB Oro and the league was expanded to 19 teams. This season was contested by odd-numbered teams for the third time in its history, which means that each regular season round one team did not play any games.

TD Systems Baskonia was the defending champion which got knocked out by Valencia Basket in the quarterfinals. Barça claimed their 16th ACB title and their 19th Spanish title, ending a 7-year drought, by downing archrivals Real Madrid in Game 2 of the Finals. Barça swept the series and completed its first Spanish double (League and Cup titles) since 2011.

Teams

Promotion and relegation (pre-season) 
A total of 19 teams contested the league, including the same 18 sides from the 2019–20 season and one promoted from the 2019–20 LEB Oro.

Teams promoted from LEB Oro
Carramimbre CBC Valladolid (did not request to join the league)
Acunsa GBC (initially was not accepted to join the league, but was proceeded to the precautionary and provisional registration, in application of the precautionary measures issued by the judicial demand of the Basque club)

Venues and locations

Personnel and sponsorship

Managerial changes

Regular season

League table

Positions by round 
The table lists the positions of teams after completion of each round. In order to preserve chronological evolvements, any postponed matches are not included in the round at which they were originally scheduled, but added to the full round they were played immediately afterwards.

Results

Playoffs

Final standings

Attendances 
The first 36 regular season rounds were played behind closed doors in response to the COVID-19 pandemic. On May 17, 2021, the Ministry of Culture of Spain, the Ministry of Health of Spain and the Spanish High Council for Sports allowed the return of the spectators to the league arenas for the last two regular season rounds and for the playoffs with the following requirements:
Autonomous community with a cumulative incidence in the last 7 days of less than 25 cases per 100,000 inhabitants and a cumulative incidence in the last 14 days of less than 50 cases per 100,000 inhabitants.
Maximum attendance of the 25 per cent of the seating capacity of the arena and, in any case, regardless of this capacity, the maximum attendance is 1,500 people.
Use of FFP2 face masks without exhalation valve for the attendants.
Conduct temperature checks at the arena entrance.

On June 2, 2021, the Spanish High Council for Sports allowed the general admission of the spectators for the playoffs, indicating that the maximum number of spectators is 1,000 people.

Awards 
All official awards of the 2020–21 ACB season.

MVP 

Source:

Finals MVP 

Source:

All-ACB Teams 

Source:

Best Young Player Award 

Source:

Best All-Young Team 

Source:

Best Defender Award 

Source:

Player of the round 

Source:

Player of the month 

Source:

ACB clubs in international competitions

Notes

References

External links 
 Official website 

 
ACB
Spanish
Liga ACB seasons